Rika Nomoto  (born ) is a Japanese volleyball player. She is part of the Japan women's national volleyball team. She competed at the 2017 FIVB Volleyball Women's World Grand Champions Cup, and the 2017 FIVB Volleyball World Grand Prix.

With her club Hisamitsu Springs she competed at the 2014 and 2015 FIVB Volleyball Women's Club World Championship.

References

1991 births
Living people
Japanese women's volleyball players
Place of birth missing (living people)
Volleyball players at the 2010 Asian Games
Volleyball players at the 2014 Asian Games
Asian Games competitors for Japan
Volleyball players at the 2018 Asian Games